A complement is something that completes something else.

Complement may refer specifically to:

The arts 
 Complement (music), an interval that, when added to another, spans an octave
 Aggregate complementation, the separation of pitch-class collections into complementary sets
 Complementary color, in the visual arts

Biology and medicine
Complement system (immunology), a cascade of proteins in the blood that form part of innate immunity
Complementary DNA, DNA reverse transcribed from a mature mRNA template
Complementarity (molecular biology), a property whereby double stranded nucleic acids pair with each other
Complementation (genetics), a test to determine if independent recessive mutant phenotypes are caused by mutations in the same gene or in different genes

Grammar and linguistics 
 Complement (linguistics), a word or phrase having a particular syntactic role
 Subject complement, a word or phrase adding to a clause's subject after a linking verb
 Phonetic complement
 Complementary, a type of opposite in lexical semantics (sometimes called an antonym)

Mathematics

Algebra
 Complement (group theory)
 Complementary subspaces
 Orthogonal complement
 Schur complement

Algorithms
 Complement (complexity), relating to decision problems and complexity classes
 Complement operator (regular expressions)
 Method of complements, in computer science
 Radix complement
 Diminished radix complement
 Ones' complement
 Two's complement

Discrete mathematics
 Complement graph
 Self-complementary graph, a graph which is isomorphic to its complement
 Complemented lattice

Geometry
 Complementary angles
 Knot complement
 Complement of a point, the dilation of a point in the centroid of a given triangle, with ratio −1/2

Logic
 Complement (set theory)
 Complementary event in probability
 Logical complement
 Bitwise complement
 Complements in boolean algebra

Other uses
 Complementary experiments, in physics

 Complement good (economics), a good often consumed together with another good 
 Ship's complement, the number of persons in a ship's company

See also
 Complementarity (disambiguation)
 Compliment (disambiguation)
 Complimentary (disambiguation)